James Murray Brumwell (born March 31, 1960 in Calgary, Alberta) is a Canadian retired ice hockey defenceman who played parts of 7 different seasons in the National Hockey League, with the New Jersey Devils and the Minnesota North Stars.

Career statistics

References

External links
 

1960 births
Living people
Billings Bighorns players
Calgary Canucks players
Calgary Wranglers (WHL) players
Canadian ice hockey defencemen
Saskatoon Blades players
Ice hockey people from Calgary
Maine Mariners players
Minnesota North Stars players
Nashville South Stars players
New Haven Nighthawks players
New Jersey Devils players
Oklahoma City Stars players
Undrafted National Hockey League players
Utica Devils players
Wichita Wind players